Wissam Najm Abd Zayd al-Zubaydi, better known by his noms de guerre Abu Nabil al-Anbari, Abul Mughirah al-Qahtani or Abu Yazan al-Humairi was a commander in the Islamic State of Iraq and the Levant (ISIL) and the leader of its Libyan branch. Al-Anbari was killed by a US military airstrike on 13 November 2015.

History
Abu Nabil al-Anbari was an Iraqi policeman who, following the 2003 invasion of Iraq, joined al-Qaida in Iraq and took part in the Iraqi insurgency. Arrested by American forces in 2008, Abu Nabil spent time in detention in Abu Ghraib prison before being released after a year and a half, upon which he returned to militancy. However, not long after he was released, he was captured and imprisoned again, being detained in Abu Ghraib prison until he was freed in a mass prison break in 2013. He would later serve as ISIL's "governor" of Salahuddin Governorate, responsible for the group's operations there, including the attack on the city of Samarra. As the governor of Salahuddin Governorate, he was responsible for overseeing the execution of up to 1,700 Shia Iraqi Air Force cadets in the Camp Speicher massacre. In 2014, ISIL's leadership dispatched him from Iraq to Libya as part of a delegation to gather pledges of allegiance to Abu Bakr al-Baghdadi from local militants and lead the nascent ISIL branch in the country.

Death
Al-Anbari was killed in a US airstrike outside of Derna, Libya on 13 November 2015. The Libya Herald reported local claims that al-Anbari had not been killed in the airstrike, however a eulogy to Abu Nabil al-Anbari was published online by a member of ISIL some weeks later. In a statement following the strike, Pentagon press secretary Peter Cook said "Abu Nabil's death will degrade [ISIL's] ability to meet the group's objectives in Libya, including recruiting new members, establishing bases in Libya, and planning external attacks on the United States." He added: "Reporting suggests [he] may also have been the spokesman in the February 2015 Coptic Christian execution video," referring to a video which showed the beheading of 21 Egyptian Copts in Libya after their kidnapping in 2015. His killing was the first military action by the United States against an ISIL target outside of Iraq and Syria while still connected to the organization's core leadership (other militants struck in countries like Nigeria and Afghanistan are not believed by US officials to be directly linked to the Iraq and Syria based leadership).

In January 2016, ISIL confirmed al-Anbari's death and launched a series of attacks and bombings across Libya named "the battle of Abu al-Mughira al-Qahtani" in his honour. Al-Anbari was succeeded as leader of ISIL in Libya by Abdul Qader al-Najdi.

References

20th-century births
2015 deaths
People killed in the Second Libyan Civil War
Islamic State of Iraq and the Levant in Libya
Islamic State of Iraq and the Levant members from Iraq
Members of al-Qaeda in Iraq
Leaders of Islamic terror groups
Year of birth missing